Stephen R. Cloud (born March 11, 1949) is an American politician who served as a Republican member of the Kansas House of Representatives from 1981 to 1986. He represented the 30th District and lived in Shawnee Mission, Kansas.

References

1949 births
Living people
Republican Party members of the Kansas House of Representatives
20th-century American politicians
People from Johnson County, Kansas